Bulbothrix cinerea is a species of lichenized fungi within the family Parmeliaceae. Among other Bulbothrix species, only B. isidiza has isidia combined with an underside that is light coloured. B. isidizas laciniae are wider, while its thallus is pale, and contains salazinic acid. In turn, B. ventricosa is larger and a black underside and rhizinae. The African species B. decurtata is an obligately saxicolous lichen, and while similar, it has a dark underside and produces salazinic acid in its medulla. The species' name thus refers to its uncommon dark gray colouration of its thallus.

Description
The species' ramification is irregularly dichotomous, with rounded apices, a crenate margin with a black line. Lacinules, soredia and pustulae are absent in this species.

Its isidia are abundant, being laminal, cylindrical, irregular in diameter, and slightly inflated in shape. Its medulla is white, with a chestnut-dark brown coloured underside, being rugose, veined and papillate. The rhizinae are light brown, simple and bulbate, measuring between 0.1 and 0.5 mm long.

Habitat
This saxicolous species finds itself tightly attached to its substrate and is frequently found on exposed quartzite rocks.  It is known from Brazil, including the Espinhaço and Mantiqueira Mountains.

References

Further reading
Benatti, M. N. "A review of the genus Bulbothrix Hale: the isidiate, sorediate, and pustulate species with medullary salazinic acid." Mycosphere 4 (2013): 1-30.
Benatti, M. N. "Three resurrected species of the genus Bulbothrix Hale (Parmeliaceae, Lichenized Fungi)." Mycosphere 3 (2012): 46-55.

Parmeliaceae
Lichen species
Lichens described in 2002
Lichens of Brazil
Taxa named by Klaus Kalb